Ute Selbig is German soprano in opera and concert. She has been a member of the Semperoper from 1985. She recorded Bach's Mass in B minor and St Matthew Passion with the Thomanerchor conducted by Georg Christoph Biller.

References

External links 
 
 Ute Selbig Semperoper

German operatic sopranos
Living people
1960 births